Harry Rodney Downer (19 October 1915 – March 1980) was an English first-class cricketer.  Downer was a right-handed batsman.  He was born in Southampton, Hampshire.

Downer served in the British Army as a 2nd Lieutenant in the Intelligence Corps during the Second World War.  Following the war, Downer represented Hampshire in two first-class matches in 1946, the first County Championship after the war.  He made his debut against Middlesex at Lord's.  In this match he was dismissed for a single run in Hampshire's first-innings by Bill Etherington.  In their second-innings he was dismissed for 4 by the same bowler.  His second and final first-class match came against Gloucestershire at the County Ground, Southampton.  In this match he was dismissed for a duck in Hampshire's first-innings by Sam Cook and in their second-innings he was run out for 3.  His two matches for Hampshire had yielded him 8 runs at a batting average of 2.00.

References

External links
Harry Downer at ESPNcricinfo
Harry Downer at CricketArchive

1915 births
1980 deaths
Cricketers from Southampton
British Army personnel of World War II
Intelligence Corps officers
English cricketers
Hampshire cricketers
Military personnel from Southampton